Park Gwang-hyun (born October 11, 1977) is a South Korean actor and singer. After winning the 1997 SBS Top Talent Competition, Park has appeared in television dramas, notably The Bean Chaff of My Life (2003), Sweet Buns (2004), Pink Lipstick (2010), Glowing She (2012), and Ruby Ring (2013). In 2012, he made his musical theatre debut with Catch Me If You Can, followed by The Scarlet Pimpernel and Summer Snow in 2013.

Personal life 
On December 7, 2014, Park married his non-celebrity wife. They have a daughter, Ha-on.

Filmography

Television series

Film

Variety show

Music video

Musical theatre

Discography

Awards and nominations

References

External links
 
 
 Park Gwang-hyun at FNC Entertainment
 
 
 
 

1977 births
Living people
South Korean male television actors
South Korean male film actors
South Korean male musical theatre actors
People from Seoul
FNC Entertainment artists